Jiang Xuemo (24 March 1918 – 18 July 2008) was a Chinese economist, translator and professor at Fudan University. During his 70-year academic career, Jiang has published more than 30 academic monographs, edited more than 10 textbooks and books on political economy, and translated more than 10 literary and economic works. He was the first Chinese to translate The Count of Monte Cristo. He was a member of the Communist Party of China (CPC).

Biography
Jiang was born in Guancheng Town of Cixi County, Zhejiang, on March 24, 1918. In 1936 he was accepted to Soochow University, majoring in economy, where he graduated in 1937, the year the Second Sino-Japanese War broke out. Then he went to Chengdu, capital of southwest China's Sichuan province, and entered Sichuan University. After graduating in 1944, he joined Financial Review as an editor and translator in British Hong Kong. After British Hong Kong was occupied by the Imperial Japanese Army, Jiang's brother Jiang Xuekai was shot and killed by Japanese forces. He came to Chongqing, Jin Kongzhang introduced him to the Finance Research Committee of the Ministry of Finance for compilation. From 1945 to 1949 he worked as an editor and translator at Fudan University in Chongqing.  Since 1949, he taught at Fudan University as Associate Professor and full Professor. He died of illness at Huadong Hospital in Shanghai, on July 18, 2008.

Translations
 The Count of Monte Cristo

Works
 Textbooks on Political Economics

References

1918 births
2008 deaths
People from Cixi
Soochow University (Suzhou) alumni
Sichuan University alumni
Academic staff of Fudan University
Economists from Zhejiang
English–Chinese translators
Writers from Ningbo
Educators from Ningbo
20th-century Chinese translators
21st-century Chinese translators